Diesel may refer to:

 Diesel engine, an internal combustion engine where ignition is caused by compression 
 Diesel fuel, a liquid fuel used in diesel engines
 Diesel locomotive, a railway locomotive in which the prime mover is a diesel engine

Arts and entertainment
 Diesel (band), a Dutch pop/rock group
 Diesel (1942 film), a German film about Rudolf Diesel
 Diesel (2022 film), an Indian Tamil language thriller film
 Diesel (game engine), a computer gaming technology
 Diesel, a former name of Brazilian rock band Udora

People

Surname 
 Nathanael Diesel (1692–1745), Danish composer, violinist and lutenist
 Vin Diesel (Mark Sinclair, born 1967), American actor, producer and director
 Rudolf Diesel (1858-1913), German inventor and mechanical engineer

Nickname or ring name
 Diesel (musician) (Mark Lizotte, born 1966), American-Australian rock singer-songwriter
 Zach Banner (born 1993), once known as The Diesel, American football player
 Diesel Dahl (born 1959), drummer of TNT
Noah Davis (baseball) (nicknamed Diesel; born 1997), American baseball player
 Kane (wrestler) (Glenn Jacobs, born 1967), American wrestler, former ring name fake "Diesel", imitating Kevin Nash's gimmick
 David S. LaForce or Diesel, American artist
 Kevin Nash (born 1959) ring name and gimmick for American professional wrestler Kevin Nash while performing in the WWF/E
 Shaquille O'Neal (born 1972), American basketball player, now music producer and DJ known as DIESEL
 John Riggins (born 1949), or The Diesel, American football player
 Joe Riggs (born 1982), or Diesel, American mixed martial artist
 Greg Williams (Australian footballer), or Diesel, Australian-rules footballer

Other uses 
 Diesel (brand), an Italian clothing company
 Diesel (dog), a French police dog killed in 2015
 10093 Diesel, an asteroid named after Rudolf Diesel
 Operation Diesel, a 2009 British military operation in Afghanistan
 Diesel, brand of A. J. Fernandez Cigars
 Diesel, a variety of Snakebite (drink)

See also

 Dießl,or Diessl, a surname